Charlene, also spelled Charleen and Charlyne, is a feminine given name, a feminine form of Charles coined in the United States in the nineteenth century; from French Charles, from Old French Charles & Carles, from the Latin Carolus, from and also reinfluenced by Old High German Karl, from the Proto-Germanic *karlaz (lit. "Free Man"/"Free Spirit"/Free Thinker); compare the Old English word churl and the Old German Kerl.

People

 Charlene, Princess of Monaco (née Wittstock, born 1978), South African swimmer and wife of Albert II, Prince of Monaco
 Charlene Almarvez (born 1993), Filipina fashion model from Laguna
 Charlene Attard (born 1987), track and field sprint athlete
 Charleen Badman, American chef and restauranteur 
 Charlene Barshefsky (born 1950), United States Trade Representative from 1997 to 2001
 Charlene Choi (born 1982), Chinese actress and singer
 Charlene Corley, former defense contractor who was convicted in 2007 on two counts of conspiracy
 Charlene Cothran, publisher of Venus and Kitchen Table News magazines
 Charleen Cha Cruz-Behag (born 1988), Filipino volleyball player
 Charlene D'Angelo (born 1950), American R&B singer best known as simply "Charlene"
 Charlene Dallas, Miss California for 1966
 Charlene Dash, African-American model
 Charlene de Carvalho-Heineken (born 1954), owner of a controlling interest in the world's third-largest brewer, Heineken International
 Charlene Drew Jarvis (born 1941), American educator and former scientific researcher and politician
 Charlene Fernetz (born 1960), Canadian actress
 Charlene Gonzales (born 1976), television and film personality and former beauty queen from the Philippines
 Charlene Honeywell (born 1957), United States District Judge on the United States District Court for the Middle District of Florida
 Charlene James, British playwright and screenwriter
 Charlene Johnson, Canadian politician
 Charlene Lima (born 1953), American politician
 Charlene Marshall (born 1933), Democratic member of the West Virginia House of Delegates
 Charlene McKenna (born 1985), award-winning Irish actress
 Charlene Mitchell (1930–2022), African American international socialist, feminist, labor and civil rights activist
 Charlene Morett (born 1957), former field hockey player from the United States
 Charlene P. Kammerer (born 1948), Bishop in the United Methodist Church
 Charlene Pesquiera, Democratic politician from the U.S. state of Arizona
 Charlene Pryer (1921–1999), female utility in the All-American Girls Professional Baseball League
 Charlene Rajendran (born 1964), Malaysian writer based in Singapore
 Charlene Rendina (born 1947), retired Australian runner
 Charlene Rink (born 1972), former professional fitness competitor and competitive female bodybuilder
 Charlene Leonora Smith, South-African journalist
 Charlene Soraia (born 1988), English singer
 Charlene Spretnak (born 1946), author, academic and feminist
 Charlene Strong (born 1963), American gay rights activist
 Charlene Teters (born 1952), American artist, educator, and lecturer
 Charlene Thomas (born 1982), English middle distance runner
 Charlene Thomas-Swinson, head women's basketball coach at Tulsa
 Charlene Tilton (born 1958), American actress best known for playing Lucy Ewing Cooper on Dallas
 Charlene White (born 1980), British journalist and newsreader
 Charlene Wong (born 1966), Canadian figure skater
 Charlyne Yi (born 1986), American actress
 Charlene Zettel, member of the California State Assembly from 1999 until 2003

Fictional characters
 Charlene Matlock, in the television show Matlock, played by Linda Purl
 Charlene Robinson, in the Australian soap opera Neighbours, played by Kylie Minogue
 Charlene Frazier Stillfield, in the television series Designing Women, played by Jean Smart
 Charlene (Transformers), in the Transformers comics
 Charlene "Charley" Davidson, one of the main Supporting characters in the Biker Mice from Mars franchise  
 Charlene Sinclair, in the television series Dinosaurs
 Charlene, a supporting character in the animated television series Victor and Valentino

See also

Charline (name)
Charlyne
 Sharlene
Charleene Closshey
Cha Cruz, born Charleen Abigaile Ramos Cruz

English given names
Feminine given names
English feminine given names